The International Committee on Intellectual Cooperation, sometimes League of Nations Committee on Intellectual Cooperation, was an advisory organization for the League of Nations which aimed to promote international exchange between scientists, researchers, teachers, artists and intellectuals. Established in 1922, it counted such figures as Henri Bergson, Albert Einstein, Sarvepalli Radhakrishnan, Jagadish Chandra Bose, Nitobe Inazo, Marie Curie, Gonzague de Reynold and Robert A. Millikan among its members. The committee was the predecessor to UNESCO, and all of its properties were transferred to that organisation in 1946.

The International Committee on Intellectual Cooperation (Geneva)
The International Committee on Intellectual Cooperation (ICIC) was formally established in August 1922. Having started out with 12 members, its membership later grew to 19 individuals, mostly from Western Europe. The first session was held on August 1, 1922, under the chairmanship of Henri Bergson. During its lifetime, the committee attracted a variety of prominent members, for instance Albert Einstein, Marie Curie, Kristine Bonnevie, Jules Destrée, Robert Andrews Millikan, Alfredo Rocco, Paul Painlevé, Gonzague de Reynold, Jagadish Chandra Bose and Sarvepalli Radhakrishnan. Einstein resigned in 1923, protesting publicly the committee's inefficacy; he rejoined in 1924 to mitigate the use German chauvinists made of his resignation. The body was successively chaired by:
 Henri Bergson (1922–1925)
 Hendrik Lorentz (1925–1928)
 Gilbert Murray (1928–1939).
The ICIC maintained a number of sub-committees (e.g. Museums, Arts and Letters, Intellectual Rights or Bibliography) which also worked with figures such as Béla Bartók, Thomas Mann, Salvador de Madariaga and Paul Valéry.

The ICIC worked closely with the International Educational Cinematographic Institute created in Rome in 1928 by the Italian government under Mussolini.

The last session took place in 1939, but the ICIC was only formally dissolved in 1946, like the League of Nations.

The International Institute of Intellectual Cooperation (Paris)
To support the work of the commission in Geneva, the organization was offered assistance from France to establish an executive branch, the International Institute of Intellectual Cooperation (IIIC), in Paris in 1926. However, the IIIC had an autonomous status and was almost only financed by the French government giving it a certain independence that created tensions with the League of Nations. It maintained relations with the league's member states, which established national commissions for intellectual cooperation and appointed delegates to represent their interests at the institute in Paris. While being an international organisation, each of the IIIC's three successive directors was French:
 Julien Luchaire (1926–1930)
 Henri Bonnet (1931–1940)
 Jean-Jacques Mayoux (1945–1946)
From 1926 to 1930, Alfred Zimmern – the well-known British classicist and a pioneering figure in the discipline of international relations – served as the IIIC's deputy director.

As a result of the Second World War, the institute was closed from 1940 to 1944. It re-opened briefly from 1945 to 1946. When it closed for good in 1946, UNESCO inherited its archives and some parts of its mission.

References

General

 
 
  (English summary)

Specific

 
 
  See also: French version (PDF) and English summary.

Notes

External links
 Research Guide on Intellectual Cooperation by UN Archives Geneva.
 Intellectual Cooperation and International Bureaux Section at UN Archives Geneva.

International scientific organizations
League of Nations
Organizations established in 1922
Organizations disestablished in 1946
Former international organizations
Organisations based in Geneva
UNESCO